Julius Sagalowsky (May 13, 1905 – October 26, 1977) was an American amateur tennis player in the 1920s.

Sagalowsky won the US national boys championship in 1921.
He was the singles runner-up at the Cincinnati Masters in 1925, falling to future International Tennis Hall of Fame enshrinee George Lott in the final, 6–3, 7–5, 6–1.

In 1926, he was the runner-up in both singles and doubles at the Indiana State Championship.

References 

American male tennis players
Tennis players from Indianapolis
1905 births
1977 deaths